The Mayor of Chapel Hill is the head of the governing and legislative body of the town of Chapel Hill, North Carolina, United States. As chair of the eight-member town council, the mayor presides over all meetings of the council and may vote on all issues before the council.

The mayor is recognized as the official head of the town for civil processes by the courts and ceremonial processes by the public. The mayor is the principal representative of the council for relations with federal, state, and other local governments.

The duties of the town council – of which the mayor presides – are "to adopt and provide for the execution of such ordinances, rules, and regulations ... as may be necessary or appropriate to protect health, life, or property, or to preserve or promote the comfort, convenience, security, good order, better government, or the general welfare of the town or its inhabitants".

Members of the council are chosen in a nonpartisan election; councilors serve staggered four-year terms, and the mayor serves two-year terms. Candidates must be registered voters and residents of Chapel Hill but while in office not appointed to any other paid government position. Councilors and the mayor must disclose all property held in the town, as well as one's business interests.

As with all members of the council, the mayor may be excused from voting on matters involving the member's official or financial conduct. Otherwise, a member's lack of a vote when the member is present is deemed an affirmative vote.

A vacancy in the office is to be filled for the remainder of the term. Should a quorum on the council (of a majority of members) not be obtained, the mayor may appoint enough members to make a quorum, and the council shall fill the other vacancies. (In the absence of the mayor, the governor may fill the vacancies.)

Before 1879, the mayor was a magistrate hired by the Board of Commissioners to exercise police powers. An 1879 amendment to the town charter formalized this role. An 1895 charter amendment established the mayor as a position elected by the town's citizens. John H. Watson became the first person elected as mayor on May 5, 1895.

List

References
General
 
 

Specific

Chapel Hill